David Ajang (born 1970 in Zaria) is a Nigerian prelate of the Catholic Church who serves as bishop of the Roman Catholic Diocese of Lafia. He was appointed bishop in 2021.

Biography 

Born in 1970, from 1982 David Ajang attended the Saint John Vianney Minor Seminary in Barkin Ladi, and from 1987 to 1990 he studied philosophy at Saint Thomas Aquinas Major Seminary in Makurdi and from 1990 to 1994 Catholic theology at Saint Augustine's Major Seminary in Jos. On December 3, 1994, he was ordained priest.

In the last years, he has been chaplain to the governor of the state of Plateau since 2015 and the parish priest of the Immaculate Conception parish and the dean of  Zaramaganda deanery since 2018.

On March 31, 2021, Pope Francis appointed him Bishop of Lafia. He was ordained bishop on following June 24th at St. William's Cathedral in Lafia nassarawa state.

References 

1970 births
Nigerian Roman Catholic bishops
People from Zaria
Roman Catholic bishops of Lafia
Living people